Harriet Deborah Vane, later Lady Peter Wimsey, is a fictional character in the works of British writer Dorothy L. Sayers (1893–1957).

Vane, a mystery writer, initially meets Lord Peter Wimsey while she is on trial for poisoning her lover (Strong Poison). The detective falls in love with her and proposes marriage but she refuses to begin a relationship with him, traumatised as she is by her dead lover's treatment of her and her recent ordeal. In Have His Carcase, she collaborates with Wimsey to solve a murder but still finds him to be overbearing and superficial. She eventually returns his love (Gaudy Night) and marries him (Busman's Honeymoon).

Character biography
Harriet Vane is the only daughter of a country doctor. She was an undergraduate at Shrewsbury College, Oxford (based on Sayers' own Somerville College, the location of which is given as the Balliol College Sports Grounds, now partly occupied by a residential annexe, on Holywell Street) and took a First in English. Her parents both died while she was quite young and she was left to make her own fortune at the age of 23. She has had some success as a writer of detective stories, living and socialising with other artists in Bloomsbury. She begins a relationship with Philip Boyes, a more literary but far less successful writer who professes not to believe in marriage, and she agrees to live with him without marrying. After a year of this arrangement, Boyes believes that she truly loves him and proposes marriage. Angered by his hypocrisy and aghast at being offered marriage as "a bad-conduct prize", Harriet breaks off the relationship.

Boyes dies soon afterwards of arsenic poisoning – the method Harriet had researched for her new book. She is arrested and tried for murdering Boyes. Wimsey comes to her rescue by proving who really poisoned Boyes.

After Harriet is acquitted, she remains quite notorious. Sales of her books skyrocket. Wimsey continues to pursue her romantically, but Harriet repeatedly declines marriage on the principle that gratitude is not a good basis for it. To relax, she takes a walking tour, during which she finds a corpse on a beach, adding to her notoriety. The press is naturally interested; Wimsey hastens to the scene, after receiving a tip from a journalist friend, to help shield Harriet from suspicion. The two investigate the death (when they are not romantically sparring) and unmask the murderer.

A few years later, in 1935, Harriet returns to her old Oxford college for a reunion (or Gaudy) and is later asked to investigate some strange occurrences there. She protests that she is not a sleuth, and recommends that the college hire professional detectives. However, failing to reach either Miss Climpson, at the female detective agency set up by Wimsey, or Wimsey himself, she agrees to assist the college. Her cover is research into Sheridan Le Fanu, an Anglo-Irish writer of Gothic tales and mystery novels of the 19th century. (In Thrones, Dominations, the Authors' Note (plural, since the novel was finished posthumously by another author) states that Vane published a monograph on Le Fanu in 1946.) After months of unpleasant incidents at the college and with no solution in sight, Harriet turns once again to Wimsey for help. By the end of the book the villain has been discovered and Harriet has finally accepted Wimsey's proposal.

The press is delighted to have a woman once accused of murder engaged to a duke's son, and happily publicises the fact. Wimsey and Vane have a quiet wedding in Oxford with no notice to the press, and escape to their new country residence, Talboys, a Tudor farmhouse in North Hertfordshire which Harriet had admired as a child and which Peter has given her as a wedding present. The body of the former owner is discovered in the cellar, leading them to investigate.

Thrones, Dominations, a novel abandoned by Sayers and finished by Jill Paton Walsh, is set in and around London, shortly after Wimsey and Vane return from their honeymoon.

The first of their children is born in the story "The Haunted Policeman".

By the time of the short story "Talboys", they have three sons: Bredon Delagardie Peter Wimsey (born in October 1936), Roger Wimsey (born 1938), and Paul Wimsey (born 1940 or 1941). Chronologically between the two are The Wimsey Papers, a series of epistolary articles Sayers wrote for The Spectator at the beginning of World War II. Jill Paton Walsh referenced The Wimsey Papers in writing A Presumption of Death, set at the beginning of the Second World War, in which Harriet takes a leading role. Sayers told friends orally that Harriet and Peter Wimsey were to have five children in all, though she did not disclose the names and sexes of the two youngest children. However, Paton Walsh did not follow this part of the Sayers heritage, and in her Wimsey books no further children come after the original three.

Fictional works by Harriet Vane (mentioned by Dorothy Sayers and/or Jill Paton Walsh)

Blades of Hatred (The Late Scholar, ch. 8)
Curiosity Killed the Cat (Busman’s Honeymoon, ch. 13) joke?
Death ‘Twixt Wind and Water (Gaudy Night, ch. 11; Thrones, Dominations, ch. 10; The Late Scholar, ch. 10)
Death in the Pot A (A Presumption of Death, ch. 4)
Fountain Pen Mystery, The (Have His Carcase, ch. 1; The Attenbury Emeralds, ch. 17; A Presumption of Death, ch. 4)
Murder by Degrees (Have His Carcase, ch. 1; A Presumption of Death, ch. 4; The Late Scholar, ch. 9)
Sands of Crime, The (Gaudy Night, ch. 1)
Sheridan Le Fanu Monograph (Thrones, Dominations, Author’s Note)
[3 Short Stories] (Busman’s Honeymoon, ch. 14)
[Novel set in Carcassonne] (Have His Carcase, ch. 1)
[Novel set in Madrid] (Have His Carcase, ch. 1)
[Series of short stories set in Berlin] (Have His Carcase, ch. 1)

Influences
Sayers consciously modelled Vane on herself, although perhaps not as closely as her fans (and even friends) sometimes thought. Some view Vane as a stand-in for the author, although Vane has many more faults than most such characters.

Sayers was among the first generation of women to receive an Oxford education, graduating BA with first-class honours in 1915 and as an MA in 1920. She gave Harriet Vane, too, an Oxford education. Vane's relationship with Boyes has many similarities with Sayers' love affair (1921–1922) with the author John Cournos (1881–1966), a Russian-born American Jew.

Biographers note that Sayers' later relationship with Bill White and her marriage to the fellow writer Oswald Atherton "Mac" Fleming provide grist for Vane's struggle to balance love (and perhaps marriage to Wimsey) and her work. After Sayers' affairs with Cournos and White were revealed, the comparisons between Sayers and Vane became more emphatic. (Neither of these affairs was publicly known during Sayers' lifetime.)

McGregor and Lewis suggest that some of Vane's and Wimsey's observations about mystery in story versus real life – though in the context of a mystery story – reflect Sayers' sense of fun and ability to laugh with her characters.

Bibliography

Books by Dorothy L. Sayers
 Strong Poison (1930)
 Have His Carcase (1932)
 Gaudy Night (1936)
 Busman's Honeymoon (1937) (As Lady Peter Wimsey)
 In the Teeth of the Evidence (1939) (editions published after 1942 usually add Talboys, the last story Sayers wrote to feature Lord and Lady Peter Wimsey)

Books by Jill Paton Walsh
 Thrones, Dominations (1998) by Dorothy L. Sayers and Jill Paton Walsh (as Lady Peter Wimsey)
 A Presumption of Death (2002) by Jill Paton Walsh (as Lady Peter Wimsey)
 The Attenbury Emeralds (2010) by Jill Paton Walsh (as Lady Peter Wimsey)
 The Late Scholar (2013) by Jill Paton Walsh (as Duchess of Denver)

Portrayal in film, TV or theatre
Harriet Vane was portrayed by Constance Cummings in a 1940 film adaptation of Busman's Honeymoon (US: The Haunted Honeymoon), with Robert Montgomery as Peter Wimsey. However, the film bore little resemblance to Sayers' writing, and she refused to see it. Vane was voiced by Sarah Badel in a BBC Radio 4 serialization of 'Busman's Honeymoon' in 1983 and was played by Harriet Walter in the 1987 BBC television adaptations of Strong Poison, Have his Carcase and Gaudy Night and by Emily Richard in the 1988 stage adaptation of Busman's Honeymoon at The Lyric Theatre, Hammersmith. In a 2005 BBC audio production of Gaudy Night, Harriet Vane was played by Joanna David.

References
Citations

Bibliography

 James Brabazon (1981) Dorothy L. Sayers: A Biography

Fictional writers
Dorothy L. Sayers characters
Female characters in literature
Literary characters introduced in 1930